The N.G.V.B. (Nieuwe Generatie Voetbal Bond, English, New Generation Football Association) is a member association of the Surinamese Football Association founded on 1 January 1930.

History 
The N.G.V.B. was founded on 10 August 1924 as the K.V.B. (Katholieke Voetbal Bond, English, Catholic Football Association), but officially changed their name to the N.G.V.B. on 1 January 1930. The name was an acronym for Nederlandsch Guyana Voetbal Bond (English, Dutch Guyanese Football Association). Together with the S.V.B. they were the top two football associations in the country, and a strong rivalry ensued.

The goals of the NGVB were as follows:
 To promote association football in Suriname and to play football in Suriname and propagate the various game systems, and to exercise the oversight there of as the official governing body.
 To act as governing body and reach Inter-colonial and International agreements in terms of football games in Suriname.
 To honor the technical and moral needs of all association members.

Prior to the foundation of the Catholic Football Association, there was another Catholic governing body of football in Suriname, namely the Katholieke Sport Centrale (English, Catholic Sports Center). Founded on 25 June 1919, the Catholic Sports Center hosted football matches on the football grounds behind the St. Petrus and Paulus Cathedral on the Gravenstraat. This organization ceased to exist in 1921.

The NGBV was the primary representative of association football in Suriname in the beginning years of the Sport. As the first association to travel abroad, traveling to British Guyana in May 1925. The N.G.V.B selection reached its height in the 1930s when players such as Hans Nahar, John Wessels, Holband, Michel Kersout, Gerrit Schoonhoven, the De Vieira brothers and the De Chehin brothers, represented the association Internationally. The association was commonly called the 'Patro' by the people of Suriname, having brought forth such teams MYOB (Mind Your Own Business), Olympia, Boys, Xerxes, Hallo and SDO.

In March 1932, a selection of the N.G.V.B. participated in the Walcot Cup in Guyana, yielding the following results:

The N.G.V.B. won the Walcot Cup in 1931 and in 1932. Goal difference was not taken into account at the time.

In May 1936, the N.G.V.B. traveled to British Guiana with a selection of their best players for a series of friendly matches, yielding the following results:

The N.G.V.B. players who participated in the aforementioned games were: A. Drielingen, A. Vieira, Ch. van Aals, M. Holtuin, J. Haakmat, Riboet, J. Tjon Poen Tjoen, M. Kersout, A. Rayman, L. Kluivert, F. Veldhuizen, C. Corte, R. King, F. Gomes, H. Pinas, E. van West, J. Tjon A Tjauw, G. Schoonhoven (capt.) and J. Amo.

National competition
Apart from participating in International tournaments, The N.G.V.B. also organized an annual competition for the national championship, running parallel to the SVB Hoofdklasse, the competition of their rival association. RKVV Olympia won the championship in 1928, while Hallo won in 1929.

Other tournaments
Apart from the N.G.V.B. national competition, the association also organized the Neptune Beker (English, Neptune Cup), the Olympia Toernooi (English, Olympia Tournament) and the Anna Margaretha competition. The Anna Margaretha competition was won by Boys in 1936, and by Mariënburg the following year.

In 1936 and 1937, NGVB won the Walcot Cup in British Guiana. The winning 1937 selection consisted of the following players:

 Drielinger (GK) - (Olympia)
 Pinas (DF) - (Surinam)
 Vieira (DF) - (Mariënburg)
 Holtuin (MF) - (Olympia)
 Moe (MF) - (Olympia)
 Tjon Poen Tjoe (MF) - (Mariënburg)
 Henricus (FW) - (Mariënburg)
 Kersout (FW) - (Mariënburg)
 Schoonhoven (FW) - (MYOB)
 Nahar (FW) - (Mariënburg)
 Veldhuizen (FW) - (Mariënburg)

On the bench: W. Amo, Suydon, F. Purperhart, Profijt, Cameron, Kersout and Goudmijn.
Coaches: J. Wessels and J. Chehin

N.G.V.B. results at the 1937 Walcot Cup

Succession
Following the foundation of the Surinaamse Voetbal Bond (SVB, English, Surinamese Football Association) in 1920 and their joining of FIFA, the global governing body of football, the rivalry of the two associations intensified, much to the disadvantage of the NGVB, since the SVB were the only Internationally recognized football association for Suriname.

The NGVB saw a steep decline in relevancy until 1954, when they joined the SVB as a member association. The NGVB were responsible for hosting tournaments and league games among the youth teams of the various clubs and districts in the country. The name of the association was again changed that year, this time to Nieuwe Generatie Voetbal Bond (English, New Generation Football Association).

In 1961, Martin Dongen joined the N.G.V.B, taking full control of managing the youth department. The associations playing field was worn out, and a new facility needed to be built. On Sunday, 4 June 1961 the N.G.V.B. Stadion (now Mgr. Aloysius Zichem Sportcentrum) was opened, and the N.G.V.B. and its functionality within Surinamese football was restored.

See also
 N.G.V.B. Stadion
 Surinaamse Voetbal Bond

References

Football in Suriname
Association football governing bodies in South America
Sports organizations established in 1930